The following is a list of international schools located only inside the Metro Manila region, and the international curricula offered, including local schools which offer a foreign education system.
Aguinaldo International School Manila (Ermita, Manila)
Australian International School Manila (Parañaque)
The Beacon School (Taguig)
Brent International School
Britesparks International School (Quezon City)
British School Manila (Bonifacio Global City)
CIE British School (Centre for International Education) (Makati)
Domuschola International School (Pasig)
European International School (Parañaque)
German European School Manila PYP, DSD (Parañaque)
Lycée Français de Manille (Parañaque)
Everest Academy Manila (Bonifacio Global City)
Fountain International School (San Juan)
Immaculate Conception Academy-Greenhills (San Juan)
International School Manila (Bonifacio Global City)
Jubilee Christian Academy (Quezon City)
Keys School Manila (Mandaluyong)
Life Academy International (Pasig)
The King's School, Manila (Parañaque)
Korean International School Philippines (Bonifacio Global City)
Leaders International Christian School of Manila (Bonifacio Global City)
Mahatma Gandhi International School, Pasay
Manila Japanese School (Bonifacio Global City)
MIT International School (Muntinlupa)
Multiple Intelligence International School (Quezon City)
Reach International School (Makati)
Reedley International School Manila (Pasig)
Remnant International Christian School (Quezon City)
Singapore School Manila (Parañaque)
Southville International School affiliated with Foreign Universities (SISFU) (Las Piñas)
Southville International School and Colleges (Las Piñas)
South SEED LPDH College (Las Piñas)
South Mansfield College (Muntinlupa)
Saint Gabriel International School (Pasig)
Saint Jude Catholic School (Manila)
Victory Christian International School (Pasig)
Xavier School (San Juan)
YouBetter International School (Makati)

See also
List of schools in Metro Manila (primary and secondary)
List of universities and colleges in Metro Manila

References

External links

 
International